Vasum cancellatum is an extinct species of medium to large sea snail, a marine gastropod mollusk in the family Turbinellidae.

Description

Distribution
Fossils of this marine species have been found in Oligocene strata of the Landes, France.

References

 Rovereto, G. (1900). Illustrazione dei molluschi fossili tongriani posseduti dal Museo Geologico della R. Universita' di Genova. Atti della R. Universita' di Genova. 15: 1–210, 1-9 pls.
 Lozouet, P. (2021). Turbinelloidea, Mitroidea, Olivoidea, Babyloniidae et Harpidae (Gastropoda, Neogastropoda) de l'Oligocène supérieur (Chattien) du bassin de l'Adour (Sud-Ouest de la France). Cossmanniana. 23: 3-69.

External links
 Grateloup J.P.-S. (1845-1847). Conchyliologie fossile des terrains tertiaires du Bassin de l'Adour (environs de Dax). 1, Univalves. Atlas. Bordeaux: Lafargue. 1845: plates 1, 3, 5, 10, 12-48 and their explanatory texts; 1847: pls 2, 4, 11, pp. i-xx, and Table générale pp. 1-12
 Michelotti, G. (1861). Études sur le Miocène inférieur de l'Italie septentrionale. Natuurkundige Verhandelingen van de Hollandsche Maatschappij der Wetenschappen te Haarlem, tweede verzameling. 14: 1-183, 16 pl
 Michelotti, G. (1861). Études sur le Miocène inférieur de l'Italie septentrionale. Natuurkundige Verhandelingen van de Hollandsche Maatschappij der Wetenschappen te Haarlem, tweede verzameling. 14: 1-183, 16 pls
 Sacco, F. (1904). I molluschi dei terreni terziarii del Piemonte e della Liguria. Parte XXX. Aggiunte e correzioni. Considerazioni generali. Indice generale dell'opera. Torino: Clausen. xxxvi + 203 pp., 31 pls
 Peyrot A. (1925-1928). Conchologie néogénique de l'Aquitaine. Actes de la Société Linnéenne de Bordeaux. 77(2): 51-194

cancellatum
Gastropods described in 1845